Colin Fleming and Bruno Soares were the defending champions but chose not to compete together. Fleming paired with Ross Hutchins, but lost in the first round to Andre Begemann and Martin Emmrich. Soares paired with Alexander Peya, but lost in the final to Julian Knowle and Marcelo Melo, 6–4, 3–6, [5–10].

Seeds

Draw

Draw

References
 Main Draw

2014 Heineken Open